This is an alphabetical, referenced list of notable Jewish American authors. For other Jewish Americans, see Lists of American Jews.

Authors 

 Warren Adler, novelist and short story writer, known for The War of the Roses
 Mary Antin, memoirist, author of The Promised Land
 Molly Antopol, short story writer, 2014 National Book Award nominee
 Jacob M. Appel, novelist (The Man Who Wouldn't Stand Up) and short story writer (Einstein's Beach House)
 Max Apple, novelist and short story writer
 Sholem Asch, novelist, essayist and playwright
 Isaac Asimov, novelist, short story writer and prolific author of nonfiction, known for his science fiction works about robots and for writing books in 9 of the 10 categories of the Dewey Decimal Classification
 Shalom Auslander, novelist
 Paul Auster, novelist
 Dorothy Walter Baruch, author and child psychologist
 Jonathan Baumbach
 Saul Bellow, novelist and winner of the Pulitzer Prize, the Nobel Prize for Literature, and the National Medal of Arts 
 Aimee Bender, novelist and short story writer, known for her often fantastic and surreal plots and characters
 Judy Blume, children's author.
 Shmuley Boteach, author of over 30 books, including best seller Kosher Sex: A Recipe for Passion and Intimacy, and Kosher Jesus
 Joshua Braff, novelist 
 Abraham Cahan, journalist, author and editor of Yiddish newspaper Jewish Daily Forward
 Hortense Calisher, novelist and president of the American Academy of Arts and Letters
 Raphael Hayyim Isaac Carregal, colonial era rabbi who published the first Jewish sermons in America
 Melvin Jules Bukiet, novelist
 Michael Chabon, novelist and short story writer, winner of the Pulitzer Prize in 2001 for The Amazing Adventures of Kavalier & Clay
 Arthur A. Cohen, novelist
 Joshua Cohen, novelist, author of Witz
 Bernard Cooper, novelist, short story writer
 Edward Dahlberg, novelist and essayist
 Anita Diamant, writer and author of the novel, The Red Tent
 E.L. Doctorow, novelist
 Bob Dylan, singer-songwriter, often regarded as one of the greatest songwriters of all time. Winner of the Nobel Prize in Literature 2016 
 Joel Eisenberg, novelist, screenwriter and producer, author of "The Chronicles of Ara" fantasy series with Steve Hillard
 Stanley Elkin, novelist and essayist
 Richard Elman, novelist and journalist
 Nathan Englander, short story writer and novelist, finalist for the Pulitzer Prize
 Marcia Falk, poet, liturgist, painter, translator
 Kenneth Fearing, novelist, editor and poet
 Edna Ferber, Pulitzer Prize winning novelist
 Barthold Fles, literary agent and non-fiction writer
 Jonathan Safran Foer, novelist
 Bruce Jay Friedman, novelist
 Kinky Friedman, novelist and musician
 Sanford Friedman, novelist
 Abraham Solomon Freidus, author of bibliographic and library works
 Daniel Fuchs, novelist, screenwriter and essayist
 Herbert Gold, novelist
 Mike Gold, Communist novelist and literary critic
 Emma Goldman, anarchist writer
 Paul Goodman, social critic and author of Growing Up Absurd
 Vivian Gornick, essayist
 Rebecca Gratz, educator and journalist
 Gerald Green, author and journalist
 Joseph Heller, author of Catch-22
 Christopher Hitchens, literary critic and political activist
 Alice Hoffman, novelist, author of Practical Magic, and thirty odd other books. 
 Irving Howe, literary critic
 Horace Kallen, author, philosopher and academic
 Nicole Krauss, novelist
 Emma Lazarus, poet and novelist 
 Fran Lebowitz, author, known for her sardonic social commentary on American life through her New York sensibilities
 Isaac Leeser, author and publisher
 Julius Lester, author, academic and African-American convert to Judaism
 Meyer Levin, novelist and journalist
 Ludwig Lewisohn, novelist, essayist and editor
 Seymour Martin Lipset, political sociologist
 Norman Mailer, novelist
 Bernard Malamud, Pulitzer Prize winning author
David Mamet, Pulitzer Prize, Academy Award, Golden Globe, and Tony Award-winning author  
 Wallace Markfield, novelist
 Theresa Malkiel, novelist and Socialist activist
 Wallace Markfield, novelist
 Walter Mosley, crime novelist
 Reggie Nadelson, novelist known particularly for her mystery works
 Moyshe Nadir, writer and journalist%
 Mordecai Manuel Noah, journalist, playwright and diplomat
Alan Oirich, writer, animator, director, and producer 
 Joseph Opatoshu, novelist and short story writer
 Cynthia Ozick, novelist and essayist
 S. J. Perelman, Oscar winning screenwriter, and novelist
 Jodi Picoult, novelist
 Marge Piercy, novelist and short story writer
 Belva Plain, novelist 
 Chaim Potok, novelist and rabbi
 Ayn Rand, novelist and founder of Objectivism
 Lev Raphael, novelist and essayist
 Lea Bayers Rapp, non-fiction and children's fiction writer
 Avrom Reyzen, author, poet and editor
 Isaac Rosenfeld, essayist, short story writer and novelist
 Leo Rosten, humorist and lexicographer
 Norman Rosten, novelist
 Henry Roth, novelist and short story writer
 Philip Roth, known for autobiographical fiction
 M. A. Rothman, inventor and speculative fiction writer
 Peter Sagal, humorist and author
 J.D. Salinger, author of The Catcher in the Rye
 Yente Serdatzky, author of short stories, playwright
 Lamed Shapiro, short story writer
 Irwin Shaw, novelist, screenwriter and playwright
 Gary Shteyngart (born 1972), Russian-born writer
 Mordechai Sheftal, diarist and officer in the Continental Army
 Isaac Bashevis Singer, Yiddish language novelist and journalist, Nobel Prize winner
 Tess Slesinger, novelist and screenwriter
 Susan Sontag, essayist and novelist
 Gertrude Stein, novelist and patron of the arts
 George Steiner (1929–2020), literary critic
 Daniel Stern, novelist
 Louise Stern, novelist and playwright
 Richard G. Stern, novelist and academic
 Steve Stern, novelist and short story writer whose work draws heavily on Jewish folklore and the immigrant experience; winner of the National Jewish Book Award
 Harvey Swados, novelist and essayist
 Judd L. Teller, writer, historian, poet. 
 Jonathan Tropper, novelist
 Leopold Tyrmand, writer
 Leon Uris, novelist
 Judith Viorst (born 1932), known for her children's literature
 Edward Lewis Wallant, novelist
 Jerome Weidman, novelist and playwright
 Sadie Rose Weilerstein (1894–1993), author of children's books, including the K'tonton stories about the adventures of a thumb-sized boy
 Nathaniel West, novelist and screenwriter
 Elie Wiesel, Holocaust survivor, Nobel Prize winner and author of 57 books
 Isaac Meyer Wise, author and rabbi
 Victoria Wolff (1903–1992), German born American writer and screenwriter
 Herman Wouk, Pulitzer Prize winning novelist
 Anzia Yezierska, novelist

See also 

 Jewish American literature
 List of Jewish American poets
 List of Jewish American playwrights
 List of Jewish American journalists
 Multi-ethnic literature of the United States
 Before Columbus Foundation

References

Authors
Jewish
Yiddish literature